Ammouliani (Ammoulianí), also known as Amoliani, is an island located in the Chalkidiki regional unit, Greece,  from Thessaloniki. Administratively it is part of the municipal unit of Stagira-Akanthos. , the resident population of the island was 547.

History
Until the early 1900s, Ammouliani was a dependency of Vatopedi Monastery of Mount Athos. In 1925, the island was given to the refugees' families who had come from islands of Propontis (Marmaras Sea), after the Asia Minor Disaster. The population of the island grew quickly and today the island has over 500 residents. It has become a tourist destination, with frequent transport from the mainland.

Historical population

References

External links
Official website of Municipality of Stágira-Ákanthos 

Islands of Greece
North Aegean islands
Landforms of Chalkidiki
Islands of Central Macedonia
Populated places in Chalkidiki